Informal Logic is a peer-reviewed academic journal that deals with multi-disciplinary topics related to reasoning and argumentation; covering both theory and practice. Topics covered include, but are not limited to, philosophy, rhetoric, communication, linguistics, psychology, and  law.

The journal is published by the University of Windsor, Windsor, Ontario, Canada. The first issue was released in 1978 with four issues being published per year.

References

External links 
 
 

Logic journals